In its primary meaning, the Hebrew word  (mīṣvā , plural  mīṣvōt ; "commandment") refers to a commandment commanded by God to be performed as a religious duty. Jewish law in large part consists of discussion of these commandments. According to religious tradition, there are 613 such commandments.

In its secondary meaning, the word mitzvah refers to a deed performed in order to fulfill such a commandment. As such, the term mitzvah has also come to express an individual act of human kindness in keeping with the law. The expression includes a sense of heartfelt sentiment beyond mere legal duty, as "you shall love your neighbor as yourself" (Leviticus 19:18).

The opinions of the Talmudic rabbis are divided between those who seek the purpose of the mitzvot and those who do not question them. The latter argue that if the reason for each mitzvah could be determined, people might try to achieve what they see as the purpose of the mitzvah, while rejecting the mitzvah itself. The former believe that if people were to understand the reason and the purpose for each mitzvah, it would actually help them to observe and perform the mitzvah. For some mitzvot, the reason is specified in the Torah.

Hebrew Bible
The feminine noun  occurs over 180 times in the Masoretic Text of the Hebrew Bible. The first use is in Genesis  where God says that Abraham has "obeyed my voice, and kept  my charge, my commandments, my statutes, and my laws". In the Septuagint the word is usually translated with entolē. In Second Temple period funeral inscriptions the epithet phil-entolos, "lover of the commandments", was sometimes inscribed on Jewish tombs. Other words are also used in Hebrew for commands and statutes; the Ten Commandments (עשרת הדיברות), for example, are the "Ten Words".

Enumeration

Jewish tradition states that there exist 613 commandments. This number does not appear in the Hebrew Bible. The tradition that the number is 613 is first recorded in the 3rd century CE, when Rabbi Simlai claimed it in a sermon, perhaps to make the point that a person should observe the Torah every day with his whole body.

However, this opinion was not universally accepted. Abraham ibn Ezra observed that there were over a thousand divine commandments in the Bible, but fewer than 300 applied to his time. Nachmanides found that the number was in dispute and uncertain. The number 613 is a rabbinical tradition rather than an exact count.

In rabbinic literature there are a number of works, mainly by the Rishonim, that attempt to enumerate 613 commandments. Probably the most famous of these is Sefer Hamitzvot by  Maimonides.

Rabbinic mitzvot

The Biblical mitzvot are referred to in the Talmud as mitzvot d'oraita, translated as commandments of the Law (Torah). In addition, rabbis of later generations decreed a number of additional laws, which are known as rabbinic laws (mitzvot derabbanan). Types of rabbinic laws include the takkanah and the gezeirah.

Medieval rabbis discussed the question of why a Jew should be required to follow rabbinic mitzvot, as they were not commanded by God, but rather by the rabbis. According to Maimonides, one who keeps rabbinic mitzvot is in fact following a Biblical commandment to obey the decisions of the Jewish religious authorities According to Nahmanides, there is no biblical source for the obligation to keep rabbinic mitzvot.

In addition, many of the specific details of the Biblical mitzvot are only derived via rabbinical application of the Oral Torah (Mishna/Gemarah); for example, the three daily prayers in any language and the recitation of the Shema (Deuteronomy 6:4-7) twice a day in any language, the binding of the tefillin and the fixing of the mezuzah (Deuteronomy 6:8-9), and the saying of Grace After Meals (Deuteronomy 8:10).

The seven rabbinic mitzvot
Seven notable mitzvot d'rabbanan are as follows:
 To recite a blessing for each enjoyment
 To ritually wash the hands before eating bread
 To prepare lights in advance of Shabbat (to have peace in the home, and to act in contradiction to customs of Karaite Judaism)
 To construct an eruv to permit carrying to and within public areas on Shabbat
 To recite the Hallel psalms on holy days
 To light the Hanukkah lights
 To read the Scroll of Esther on Purim

These seven rabbinical commandments are treated like Biblical commandments insofar as, prior to the performance of each, a benediction is recited ("Blessed are You, O  our God, King of the universe, Who has commanded us ..."). In gematria, these seven, added to the 613 Biblical commandments, form a total of 620, corresponding to the numerical value of the phrase Keter Torah ("The Crown of the Torah").

Categories of mitzvot

The commandments have been divided also into three general categories: mishpatim; edot; and chukim. Mishpatim ("laws") include commandments that are deemed to be self-evident, such as not to murder and not to steal. Edot ("testimonies") commemorate important events in Jewish history. For example, the Shabbat is said to testify to the story that Hashem created the world in six days and rested on the seventh day and declared it holy. Chukim ("decrees") are commandments with no known rationale, and are perceived as pure manifestations of the Divine will.

The commandments are divided into positive ("thou shalt") and negative ("thou shalt not") commandments. According to Jewish tradition, the 613 commandments contain 365 negative commandments and 248 positive commandments.

Many commandments concern only special classes of peoplesuch as kings, Kohanim (the priesthood), Levites, or Nazaritesor are conditioned by local or temporary circumstances of the Jewish nation, as, for instance, the agricultural, sacrificial, and Levitical laws. Some are sex-dependent: for example, women are exempt from certain time-related commandments (such as shofar, sukkah, lulav, tzitzit and tefillin).

Three types of negative commandments fall under the self-sacrificial principle yehareg ve'al ya'avor, meaning "One should let oneself be killed rather than violate it". These are murder, idolatry, and forbidden sexual relations. For all other commandments, one must violate the commandment if the only alternative is to be killed.

According to Rabbi Ishmael, only the principal commandments were given on Mount Sinai, the remainder having been given in the Tent of Meeting. Rabbi Akiva, on the other hand, was of the opinion that they were all given on Mount Sinai, repeated in the Tent of Meeting, and declared a third time by Moses before his death. According to the Midrash, all divine commandments were given on Mount Sinai, and no prophet could add any new ones.

Six constant mitzvot
Out of the 613 Mitzvot mentioned in the Torah, there are six mitzvot which the Sefer Hachinuch calls "constant mitzvot": "We have six mitzvot which are perpetual and constant, applicable at all times, all the days of our lives".

 To know God, and that God created all things.
 Not to have any god(s) beside God
 To know God's Oneness.
 To fear God.
 To love God.
 Not to pursue the passions of your heart and stray after your eyes.

Mitzvot and Jewish law

In rabbinic thought, the commandments are usually divided into two major groups, positive commandments (obligations) –  [] and negative commandments (prohibitions) –  [].

The system describing the practical application of the commandments is known as Halakha. Halakha is the development of the mitzvot as contained in the Written Law (Torah), via discussion and debate in the Oral Law, as recorded in the rabbinic literature of the classical era, especially the Mishnah and the Talmud. The halakha dictates and influences a wide variety of behavior of traditionalist Jews.

Applicability in the messianic age
The majority view of classical rabbis was that the commandments will still be applicable and in force during the Messianic Age. However, a significant minority of rabbis held that most of the commandments will be nullified by, or in, the messianic era. Examples of such rabbinic views include:
 that the grain-offering of Judah and Jerusalem will be pleasing to God as in the days of old, and as in ancient years (Malachi 3:4)
 that today we should observe the commandments (Babylonian Talmud, Tractate Avodah Zarah 3a, 4b); because we will not observe them in the world to come (Rashi)
 that in the future all sacrifices, with the exception of the Thanksgiving-sacrifice, will be discontinued (Midrash Vayikra Rabbah 9:7)
 that all sacrifices will be annulled in the future (Tanchuma Emor 19, Vayikra Rabbah 9:7)
 that God will permit what is now forbidden (Midrash Tehillim, Mizmor 146:5)
 that most mitzvot will no longer be in force (Babylonian Talmud, Niddah 61b and Shabbat 151b).

There is no accepted authoritative answer within Judaism as to which mitzvot, if any, would be annulled in the Messianic era. This is a subject of theoretical debate and, not being viewed as an immediately practical question, is usually passed over in favor of answering questions of the practical halakha.

See also
 Aveira (Transgression)
 Dharma (Hindu/Buddhist/Sikh)
 Emil Fackenheim
 Fard (Islamic)
 Law given to Moses at Sinai
 Mitzvah goreret mitzvah
 Pay it forward
 Seven Laws of Noah
 Tao (Chinese)
 Volunteerism

References 

 
Commandments
Jewish law and rituals
Hebrew words and phrases in Jewish law